Michel Bibard (born 30 November 1958) is a French football manager and former player. He is the head coach of French club FC Saint-Cloud.

As a player, Bibard was a defender. He won the gold medal with the France Olympic team at the 1984 Summer Olympics in Los Angeles, and earned six international caps for the main France national team during the mid-1980s. A player of Paris Saint-Germain from 1985 to 1991, he was a member of the France team at the 1986 FIFA World Cup.

Honours 
Nantes

 Division 1: 1976–77, 1979–80, 1982–83
 Coupe de France: 1978–79; runner-up: 1982–83

Paris Saint-Germain

 Division 1: 1985–86

France Olympic
 Summer Olympic Games: 1984
France
 Artemio Franchi Trophy: 1985

References

External links
 French Football Federation Profile 

1958 births
Living people
People from Amboise
Sportspeople from Indre-et-Loire
French footballers
French football managers
Association football defenders
France international footballers
Olympique Saumur FC players
FC Nantes players
Paris Saint-Germain F.C. players
Ligue 1 players
1986 FIFA World Cup players
Olympic footballers of France
Olympic gold medalists for France
Footballers at the 1984 Summer Olympics
Olympic medalists in football
France youth international footballers
Medalists at the 1984 Summer Olympics
Expatriate footballers in Oman
French expatriate footballers
French expatriate sportspeople in Oman
Footballers from Centre-Val de Loire